Nicholas H. Owings (December 21, 1836 – February 5, 1903) was an American politician in the state of Washington. He served in the Washington State Senate from 1889 to 1893 (1889–91 for district 16, 1891–93 for district 18).

References

Republican Party Washington (state) state senators
1837 births
1900 deaths
People from Indianapolis
19th-century American politicians
People from Tumwater, Washington